Peter Henry Metzelaars (born May 24, 1960) is a former American football tight end who played for the Seattle Seahawks, Buffalo Bills, Carolina Panthers, and Detroit Lions in a sixteen-year career in the National Football League. Following his playing career, Metzelaars became a coach.

High school and college
Metzelaars played high school football at Portage Central High School in Portage, Michigan, and played college football at Wabash College, graduating from Wabash in 1982. While at Wabash, he played for an undefeated football team, while also leading the basketball team to the NCAA Division III national championship as a senior and being named the tournament's Most Outstanding Player. During his senior year, he earned Academic All-American honors In football, he was coached by Stan Parrish and in basketball coached by legendary basketball coach Mac Petty.

NFL career
Metzelaars was taken in the 3rd round with the 75th pick by Seattle in the 1982 NFL Draft. He played for three seasons in Seattle before being traded to the Bills in 1985. When Jim Kelly joined the Bills in 1986, Metzelaars became a productive part of the offense. He played with the Bills in their 4 Super Bowl losses from 1990 to 1993, and scored a touchdown in Super Bowl XXVI. Metzelaars' best season was in 1993, when he caught 68 passes for 609 yards and 4 touchdowns.

Metzelaars was not re-signed by the Bills after the 1994 season. He then signed a three-year, $2.4 million deal with the Carolina Panthers.  He caught the first touchdown pass in Carolina franchise history, but only played one season for them.  He finished his career by playing two seasons for the Detroit Lions, starting in 17 of the 31 games he appeared in while splitting time with David Sloan.  The Lions offensive coordinator in 1996 was Tom Moore.  Metzelaars would go on to work alongside Moore later in their careers.

Metzelaars finished his 16 NFL seasons with 383 receptions for 3,686 yards and 29 touchdowns in 235 games. At the time of his retirement, his 235 games were the most ever played by a tight end in NFL history.

Coaching
After retiring, Metzelaars moved into the coaching ranks as the offensive coordinator at Charlotte Christian School from 1998 to 2002. In 2003, Metzelaars joined Wingate University as an assistant offensive coach but also coached in NFL Europe with Barcelona during the off-season. He also was an intern with the Indianapolis Colts during their 2003 training camp, assisting with the tight ends under offensive coordinator Tom Moore. In 2004, Metzelaars joined the Colts staff full-time as the offensive quality control coach. After reaching four Super Bowls with the Buffalo Bills as a player, he finally won a ring with the Colts' triumph in Super Bowl XLI. In 2012, Metzelaars joined the Buffalo Bills staff full-time as the tight ends coach. He, along with the entire Bills coaching staff, was dismissed on December 31, 2012. On January 24, 2014 Metzelaars became tight ends coach for the San Diego Chargers, replacing Jason Michael who left to be offensive coordinator for the Tennessee Titans. He was reunited with former Buffalo Bills teammate Frank Reich, who was promoted to be the Chargers' new offensive coordinator.

In 2018, Metzelaars became the offensive line coach for the Atlanta Legends of the newly formed Alliance of American Football.

In 2023 he joined the Helevetic Guards in the European League of football as Special Teams Coordinator and Tight Ends Coach.

Personal life
Metzelaars and his wife, Barbara, have two sons: Anthony and Jonathan.

In 2011, Metzelaars was inducted into the Academic All-American Hall of Fame.

References

External links
 San Diego Chargers profile
 

1960 births
Living people
American football tight ends
American men's basketball players
Atlanta Legends coaches
Buffalo Bills players
Buffalo Bills coaches
Carolina Panthers players
Detroit Lions players
High school football coaches in North Carolina
Indianapolis Colts coaches
People from Portage, Michigan
People from Three Rivers, Michigan
Players of American football from Michigan
San Diego Chargers coaches
Seattle Seahawks players
Wabash Little Giants basketball players
Wabash Little Giants football players
Wingate Bulldogs football coaches
Ed Block Courage Award recipients
European League of Football coaches